The Marsala Ship is the oldest known warship wreck in existence and it was found in a harbor at Sicily, Italy. The discovery came about accidentally by a commercial dredging operation. A four-year excavation took place for historical reasons to save what was left of the ruins of the 2000 year old Punic warship. There were ancient artifacts found with the wreckage. The remains of the ship are displayed at the Archaeological Museum Baglio Anselmi specially built for it.

Excavation
The discovery of the vessel was in 1969 by a commercial dredge captain bringing up sand from the sea bottom for making glass and accidentally uncovered buried wood from ancient boats in the site known as Punta Scario. In 1971, the local current flow movement caused a sandbank to expose the Punic Ship's stern post of protruding timber. This endangered the shipwreck, threatening the loss of the potential historical value of the information it revealed about the Phoenicians. Rescue excavation began immediately in earnest and continued for the next four years. Financial help came from scholarly foundations in Europe and the United States. An international team of engineers and naval experts done the field work which included professor William Culican of the University of Melbourne, scholar John Curtis of the British Museum, and epigraphist professor William Johnstone of Aberdeen University.

The Sicilian authorities and British School at Rome selected Honor Frost to manage and direct the excavation. Frost and her international team of marine archeologists excavated the site. Scholar Pietro Alagna of Marsala helped in the logistics of the excavation and management of the conservation laboratory. Progress reports were published yearly in the Nautical Archaeology Society's International Journal. When the work of the project ended, an extensive report was published in 1976 by the Lincean Academy in Rome as an addendum to News of the Excavations of Antiquity. Some extremely rare finds amongst the shipwreck were an interwoven basket, an end of a rope that had an eye splice , a small brush, a blade of a knife, a spade, and some toggling harpoons. Also found were parts of a human skeleton, possibly of a sailor trapped by the ship's ballast.

Characteristics

The Marsala Ship is the oldest ocean-going vessel known to archaeologists from ancient man-made material found. It is scientific evidence of a shipwreck discovered in 1969 in a site known as Punta Scario in the bay of Marsala in Sicily, Italy, next to the Aegadian Islands in the Mediterranean Sea. The Marsala Ship's country of origin is known because of painted Phoenicia letters put on the sides that its Punic builders from the ancient city of Carthage in northern Africa had done.

Its architectural design and contents in it hold give evidence that it could not have been a merchant cargo ship. Such a ship made regular long journeys and needed containers of considerable size for storing water. It also required grinders and mortars for preserved food that had been dried. In addition the ship would normally carry communal cooking pots for many men. A merchant cargo ship would also have had fish-hooks for catching fresh fish to supplement the food supply on long journeys. There was no fishing accessories found at the site.

The Marsala vessel that had been accidentally uncovered was discovered to have had only individual serving cups and bowls. The ship's drinkable liquids of water and wine were carried in vases of a variety of shapes. Food remains were various kinds of fresh meat that evidence of butcher-cut bones revealed. Bones of animals like deer and oxen were all found, as well as those of pigs and sheep. This determined it was planned as a warship and not as a merchant cargo vessel. The existence of ballast stones also confirmed that it was a ship used for exploring and searching or for crashing and destroying smaller boats.

It is understood by historian Honor Frost and a team of British archaeologists to be a Liburna war galley long ship. It was an oar propelled vessel with 68 oarsmen and about 34 Carthaginian soldiers involved in fighting the Battles of the Egadi Islands of 241 BC. The First Punic War combat was the last skirmish between the people of Carthage and the Roman civilization. Carbon-14 investigation conducted by nuclear physicists on timbers and other vessel materials gave a date of about 235 BC.

The above pictures of the Marsala ship excavation are from the Archaeological Museum Baglio Anselmi made for it at the city Marsala in Sicily. Years later a sister ship was discovered nearby the original find and it had similar features.

See also
Alkedo
 Arles Rhône 3
Roman ship of Marausa

References

Sources

External links

Ancient shipwrecks
Marsala
Ships preserved in museums
Treasure from shipwrecks
Shipwrecks of Italy
Shipwrecks in the Mediterranean Sea
1969 archaeological discoveries
Trade in Phoenicia
Phoenician shipwrecks